The Beta C-Mag is a 100-round capacity drum magazine manufactured by the Beta Company. It was designed by Jim Sullivan and first patented in 1987 and has been adapted for use in numerous firearms firing the 5.56×45mm NATO, 7.62×51mm NATO, and 9×19mm Parabellum cartridges. C-Mag is short for century magazine, referring to its hundred-round capacity. It has two drum units, each of which hold half of the cartridges inserted into the magazine. The latest version of the magazine is available with a transparent backing to allow the user to see the number of rounds remaining in the magazine.

A version adapted for the M16 rifle is used by the U.S. military.

Design

The C-Mag is a compact twin-drum magazine design that accepts up to 100 rounds of ammunition. It consists of two main components: the twin-drum storage housing and an interchangeable feed clip assembly. The storage housing is standard and fits any like-caliber weapon. The feed clip assembly serves as an adapter for the specific weapon.

Before loading and after firing, the feed clip is filled with spacer rounds that are an integral part of the magazine. The upper half of the top spacer round is tapered to allow the weapon bolt to close after the last round is fired. The length of the string-set depends on the customized feed clip for the individual weapon.

During loading, cartridges are inserted on top of the spacer rounds, through the feed clip and into the drums. The cartridge column splits at the juncture of the feed clip and the housing to distribute the ammunition evenly into the drums in two concentric rows.

During firing, spring-driven rotors advance the cartridges in both drums until they meet at a cam blade that merges the cartridges into a single column that feeds up through the feed clip and into the weapon.

Firearms compatible with C-Mag cartridges
9×19mm Parabellum
 Colt 9mm SMG
 Heckler & Koch MP5
 Uzi
 Glock, plus these firearms using a Glock magazine:
 KRISS Vector Gen II
 Kel-Tec SUB-2000
 CZ Scorpion Evo 3

5.56×45mm NATO (STANAG magazine with Mini-14 compatibility)
 FN Minimi
 M249 light machine gun
 Ultimax 100
 AR-15
 Beretta ARX-160
 FN SCAR
 Heckler & Koch G36
 Heckler & Koch HK33
 Heckler & Koch HK416
 Heckler & Koch HK 93
 Heckler & Koch XM8
 M4 carbine
 M16 rifle
 PVAR rifle
 Ruger Mini-14
 SA80
 SIG SG550 / 551 / 552 / 553 / 556
 Steyr AUG
 CZ 805 BREN

7.62×51mm NATO
 AR-10A, and various firearms using SR-25 pattern magazines.
 FN FAL (no longer available)
 FN SCAR (modified FAL-pattern)
 Heckler & Koch HK91 and Heckler & Koch G3
 M14 rifle
 AR-10B (modified M14-pattern)

Performance evaluations

Reliability
A test in 2003 by U.S. Army soldiers in Afghanistan found the C-Mag unreliable in simulated combat conditions and reported frequent failures to feed among the issues; likewise, British Armed Forces trials found that the C-Mag did not give reliable performance when loaded with British-issue ammunition. The Beta C-Mag is not in widespread use by U.S. military forces, and has not been type-classified.

In November 2008, the U.S. Army Experimental Task Force (AETF) at Fort Bliss, Texas, evaluated six Beta C-Mag magazines. Four magazines—two with black covers and two with clear covers—were used with M4 carbines in three firing scenarios: controlled pair, controlled burst, and rapid fire. According to the memorandum summarizing the evaluation, the four magazines "performed flawlessly in all three scenarios without jams or stoppages". Additionally, two magazines with black covers were evaluated with M249 light machine guns in controlled burst and rapid-fire scenarios. These also performed without "issues",  according to the memo, which also notes that soldiers "had only positive comments" about the C-Mag magazines during the After Action Review (AAR).

Test-fired with a Heckler & Koch HK91, Heckler & Koch G3 and two other Heckler & Koch-based weapons, the 7.62mm C-Mag was found to operate without problems in either loading or firing at rates up to 1,000 rounds per minute.

See also
 Drum magazine
 Magazine
 North Hollywood shootout

References

External links
 

Magazines (firearms)
Firearm components